Megachile cordata is a species of bee in the family Megachilidae. It was described by Smith in 1853, and renamed in 1879.

References

cordata
Insects described in 1853